National Route 503 is a national highway of Japan connecting between Takamori, Kumamoto and Hyūga, Miyazaki in Japan, with total length has .

See also

References

503
Roads in Kumamoto Prefecture
Roads in Miyazaki Prefecture